Saeid Sayyar (born January 20, 1992, is an Iranian weightlifter.

Major results

References

Iranian male weightlifters
Living people
1992 births
21st-century Iranian people